Topo Soft was a Spanish software house for 8-bit home computers that emerged during the eighties. They were part of the golden era of Spanish software. It dissolved in 1994 due to economic problems related with the late arrival of 16-bit computers in Spain. Some of its workers founded Pyro Studios in 1998. However, there are also criticisms, and in 2019 Eugenio Barahona and Cancho acknowledged that sometimes the planning to produce a certain amount of video games affected the quality, leaving no time to "finish them off in conditions, or simply test them in order to balance their playability before releasing them for sale".

The eighties, 8-bits 
Topo Soft published multiple games for the MSX and PC such as Survivor, Stardust, Gremlins 2: The New Batch, and Desperado (published in England as Gun.Smoke) .

16-bits 
 Quickit, a graphical system to handle MS-DOS

References

External links 
Topo Soft at mobygames.com
Topo Soft advertisements at amstrad.es

Defunct video game companies of Spain
Video game companies disestablished in 1994
1994 disestablishments in Spain